Nelly Borgeaud (29 November 1931 – 14 July 2004) was a French film actress. She appeared in more than 40 films between 1955 and 2001. Borgeaud was born in Geneva, Switzerland, and died in Creuse, France, at age 72. Her film career spanned 50 years. In 1968, she appeared on Broadway as Elmire in Tartuffe.

Filmography

References

External links

 

1931 births
2004 deaths
French film actresses
Actors from Geneva
20th-century French actresses